Lielvārde Parish is an administrative unit of Ogre Municipality in the Vidzeme region of Latvia. It was created in 2010 from the countryside territory of Lielvārde town. At the beginning of 2014, the population of the parish was 1033.

Towns, villages and settlements of Lielvārde parish 
Annas
Glaudītāji
Kaibala
Senči
Svētiņi

References 

Parishes of Latvia
Ogre Municipality
Vidzeme